Sainte-Angèle-de-Prémont is a municipality in Maskinongé Regional County Municipality (RCM), in the Mauricie, region of the province of Quebec, in Canada.

The economy of this municipality is mainly focused on forestry and agriculture.

References

Incorporated places in Mauricie
Municipalities in Quebec